The Barn Dance is a Mickey Mouse short animated film first released on March 15, 1929, as part of the Mickey Mouse film series; it was the first of twelve shorts released during that year. It was directed by Walt Disney with Ub Iwerks as the head animator. The title is written as Barn Dance on the poster, while the full title is used on the title screen. In 1931, when it was made in to a picture book, Donald Duck appeared in it; which would make his first ever appearance.

Plot
The barn dance of the title is the occasion which brings together Minnie Mouse and her two suitors: Mickey and Peg-Leg Pete. The latter two and their vehicles are first seen arriving at Minnie's house in an attempt to pick her up for the dance. Mickey turns up in his horse-cart while Pete in a newly purchased automobile.

Minnie initially chooses Pete to drive her to the dance but the automobile unexpectedly breaks down. She resorts to accepting Mickey's invitation. They are later seen dancing together, but Mickey proves to be a rather clumsy dancer as he repeatedly steps on Minnie's feet. She consequently turns down his invitation for a second dance. She instead accepts that of Pete, who proves to be a better dancing partner.

Mickey then attempts to solve his problem by placing a balloon in his shorts. That apparently helps him to be "light on his feet" and he proceeds to ask Minnie for another dance. She accepts and is surprised to find his dancing skills to have apparently improved. Pete soon discovers Mickey's trick and points it out to Minnie. Minnie is visibly disgusted by this attempt at deception. As a result, she leaves Mickey and resumes dancing with Pete, leaving Mickey crying on the floor.

Production
Like Mickey's previous cartoon, Steamboat Willie, The Barn Dance was planned as a sound cartoon, and there are many sound gags, including Mickey using a passing duck as a horn for his car. The dance also demonstrates the studio's increasing facility with mixing cartoon action with musical rhythm.

This short is notable for featuring Mickey turned down by Minnie in favor of Pete, something that was rare even in future cartoons. It is also an unusual appearance of the Pete character; previously depicted as a menacing villain, he is portrayed here as a well-mannered gentleman. In addition, Mickey was not depicted as a hero but as a rather ineffective young suitor. In his sadness and crying over his failure, Mickey appears unusually emotional and vulnerable.

The style of Pete's clothing and car were the inspiration for his appearance in the 2013 short Get a Horse!

Reception
Variety (February 13, 1929): "The Barn Dance has laughs, although a little jerky in spots. It can be spotted anywhere on talking short programs as pleasant relaxation and change of diet from the straightaway shorts with human actors."

Motion Picture News (February 16, 1929): "Walt Disney has evolved another of those animal characters for comedy purposes. This is Mickey Mouse. Mickey is wooing another mousie and takes her to a barn dance with a lot of the usual comedy ticks following. There are some laughs in it."

The Film Daily (February 17, 1929): "This is another of the adventure of Mickey Mouse and his sweetie. The villain cat tries to take gal driving in his auto, which is wrecked. So she goes to the barn dance with Mickey who is driving his carriage drawn by the old plug. This horse is one of the funniest cartoon characters seen in the animateds. Later at the dance the cat shows up and tries to take the gal away again, but Mickey fools him. The sound effects are funny, and this number enhances the usual cartoon subject easily 100 per cent."

Voice cast
 Mickey Mouse: Walt Disney
 Minnie Mouse: Walt Disney
 Pete: Walt Disney

Home media
The short was released on December 7, 2004, on Walt Disney Treasures: Mickey Mouse in Black and White, Volume Two: 1929-1935.

See also
Mickey Mouse (film series)

References

External links
 
 
 
 The Barn Dance at The Encyclopedia of Disney Animated Shorts

1920s Disney animated short films
1929 films
1929 short films
1929 comedy films
1929 animated films
1920s dance films
Mickey Mouse short films
American black-and-white films
Films directed by Walt Disney
Films produced by Walt Disney
Columbia Pictures short films
Columbia Pictures animated short films
Animated films about cats
Films scored by Carl Stalling
Animated films without speech
1920s American films